Rick Chamberlin (born April 2, 1957) is an American college football coach and former player. He is the former head football coach at University of Dayton, a position he held from January 2008 until his retirement in November 2022.

Head coaching record

References

External links
 Dayton profile

1957 births
Living people
American football linebackers
Dayton Flyers football coaches
Dayton Flyers football players
Sportspeople from Springfield, Ohio
Coaches of American football from Ohio
Players of American football from Ohio